Americardia media , the Atlantic strawberry cockle, is a species of saltwater clam, a marine bivalve mollusc in the family Cardiidae, the cockles. This species can be found along the Atlantic coast of North America, from Cape Hatteras to the West Indies.

References

Cardiidae
Bivalves described in 1758
Taxa named by Carl Linnaeus